Devonport City Council (or City of Devonport) is a local government body located in the city and surrounds of Devonport in northern Tasmania. The Devonport local government area is classified as urban and has a population of 25,415, which also encompasses Lillico, Tugrah and part of Spreyton.

History and attributes
The Devonport municipality was established on 1 January 1907, becoming a city council on 1 January 1981. Devonport was proclaimed a city by Charles, Prince of Wales on 21 April 1981, in a ceremony conducted on the Devonport Oval. The city motto is The City with Spirit, this gives reference to it being the home base for the passenger ferry ships Spirit of Tasmania I and Spirit of Tasmania II.

Devonport is classified as urban, regional and small (URS) under the Australian Classification of Local Governments.

Government

Suburbs

Not in above List
 Leith

See also
Local government areas of Tasmania

References

External links
 Devonport City Council official website
Local Government Association Tasmania
Tasmanian Electoral Commission - local government

Devonport
Devonport, Tasmania